Sharpless 101 (Sh2-101) is a H II region emission nebula located in the constellation Cygnus. It is sometimes also called the Tulip Nebula because it appears to resemble the outline of a tulip when imaged photographically. It was catalogued by astronomer Stewart Sharpless in his 1959 catalog of nebulae.

Sh2-101, at least in the field seen from Earth, is in close proximity to microquasar Cygnus X-1, site of one of the first suspected black holes. The companion star of Cygnus X-1 is a spectral class O9.7 Iab supergiant with a mass of 21 solar masses and 20 times the radius of the Sun. The period of the binary system is 5.8 days and the pair is separated by 0.2 astronomical units. The black hole has a mass of 15 solar masses and a Schwarzschild radius of 45 km. A bowshock is created by a jet of energetic particles from the black hole as they interact with the interstellar medium. It can be seen as an arc at the top of the photo on the left.

See also
Sharpless catalogue

References

External links

Sharpless Catalog 

H II regions
Cygnus (constellation)
Sharpless objects